Johnstown is a home rule municipality in Weld and Larimer counties in the U.S. state of Colorado.  The population was 9,887 at the 2010 United States Census.

History
The Town of Johnstown began with the vision of Harvey J. Parish before its platting in 1902. The town was named for Parish's son. The town was incorporated in 1907.

A meteorite fall in the adjacent former town of Elwell on the afternoon of 6 July 1924, became known as the Johnstown meteorite. The meteorite fell during an outdoor funeral service with more than 200 people attending who witnessed the event or heard the several stones falling. The meteorite is classified as an "achondrite stony meteorite of the diogenite class in the HED group" of meteorites that are believed to have hived off of the asteroid Vesta approximately one billion years ago.

Geography
Johnstown is located just west of the confluence of the Big Thompson River and the Little Thompson River. Greeley is about ten miles to the east-northeast and Loveland is approximately nine miles to the northwest.

Demographics

As of the census of 2010, there were 9,887 people, 3,356 households, and 2,738 families residing in the town. The racial makeup of the town was 91.7% White, 0.8% African American, 1.4% Native American, 1.4% Asian, and 7.3% from other races. Hispanic or Latino of any race were 16.8% of the population.

There were 3,356 households, out of which 42.8% had children under the age of 18 living with them, 69.7% were married couples living together, 7.0% had a female householder with no husband present, and 18.4% were non-families. 13.8% of all households were made up of individuals, and 4.0% had someone living alone who was 65 years of age or older. The average household size was 2.95 and the average family size was 3.25.

In the town, the population was spread out, with 31.2% under the age of 18, 5.8% from 18 to 24, 32.3% from 25 to 44, 22.0% from 45 to 64, and 8.7% who were 65 years of age or older.  The median age was 33.7 years. For every 100 females, there were 101.7 males.

The median income for a household in the town was $69,919, and the median income for a family was $75,000. Males had a median income of $55,426 versus $40,536 for females. The per capita income for the town was $26,324.  About 5.4% of families and 5.9% of the population were below the poverty line, including 6.4% of those under age 18 and 5.1% of those age 65 or over.

Education
Johnstown is served by two school districts. The majority of residents fall within Weld County School District RE-5J, though the northwest of the town falls within Thompson R2-J School District.

Johnstown
 Letford Elementary School (closed)
 Elwell Elementary School
 Pioneer Ridge Elementary School
 Roosevelt High School

Milliken
 Knowledge Quest Academy 
 Milliken Middle School 
 Milliken Elementary School

Notable people
Reed Doughty (NFL player – Washington Commanders).  Doughty was raised in Johnstown and played varsity football at Roosevelt High School.

See also

List of municipalities in Colorado

References

External links

 
 Town of Johnstown Facebook Page
 CDOT map of the Town of Johnstown
 Johnstown Breeze (weekly newspaper)
  Johnstown Historical Society
 Johnstown BBQ Day (Annual town celebration, first Saturday of June)
 Own Your Share of Johnstown, Colorado

Towns in Colorado
Towns in Weld County, Colorado
Towns in Larimer County, Colorado